Bartolomeo di Cassino (late 16th century) was an Italian painter active in the Mannerist period. He was born in Milan. He was a pupil of Vincenzo Civerchio.

References

16th-century Italian painters
Italian male painters
Painters from Milan
Italian Renaissance painters
Mannerist painters